Donnington Airpark  is located on the Flinders Highway at Woodstock, a suburb of Townsville in Australia. It is also called Woodstock Airport and is known for its airshows.

History

The airpark and associated grass runways were constructed on virgin bushland by Ray Smith in 1969, as a satellite airfield to Townsville Airport, for general aviation. There are other airfields in the Woodstock area.

The Donnington Country Fly-In, later known as the Donnington Airshow and Country Fly-In, was held annually at Donnington Airpark from 1979 to 1993 inclusive. It showcased a wide range of aircraft types, from ultralights and gyrocopters to commercial, military and warbirds, with associated historic vehicle displays, trade displays and entertainment. The event was held as a fund-raiser for the Near and Far Auxiliary of the Royal Flying Doctor Service of Australia (RFDS) and was the longest-running privately organised airshow in North Queensland.

See also
 List of airports in Queensland

References

Airports in Queensland
Townsville
Airports established in 1969